Meli Park was a theme park which was opened in 1935 in Adinkerke in the municipality of De Panne on the Belgian coast.

History

The bee-themed amusement park was initiated by Alberic-Joseph Florizoone, owner of a honey company. Its mascot was a bee. It was one of the first Belgian theme parks. Over the years some new attractions were added. The first ones were the labyrinth and the zoo. In the 1950s, a miniature golf course, french formal gardens, a fairytale forest, water organ were introduced. Over the years, it became one of the biggest attractions in Belgium as Antwerp Zoo and Caves of Han-sur-Lesse.

Into the 1970s and the 1980s, with a growing variety of rides, Meli Park's visitor numbers reached 700,000 per annum. Its icon attraction was the Apirama dark ride, opened in 1979, featuring hundreds of animated bees.

The park closed in 1999 because the park was sold to the Flemish children's television company Studio 100 and rethemed as Plopsaland. In 1999 Alberic-Joseph Florizoone was inducted into the IAAPA Hall of Fame, an honor reserved for amusement industry innovators and pioneers.

Attractions

Roller coasters

Thrill rides

References

Further reading
 Canonne, Xavier, Gunzig, Thomas. (2011). Meli : l'autre royaume. Mont-sur-Marchienne: Musée de la photographie. .
 Florizoone, Alberic-Joseph. (1990). Meli, mijn leven. Anvers: Multimedia. .

External links

 
 

Defunct amusement parks
1935 establishments in Belgium
1999 disestablishments in Belgium
Amusement parks opened in 1935
Amusement parks closed in 1999
Amusement parks in Belgium
Buildings and structures in West Flanders
Tourist attractions in West Flanders
De Panne